Dora Curtis (1875-1920) was a British artist and a member of the 1914 expedition down the Yenisei River in Siberia to the Kara Sea led by Polish anthropologist Maria Antonina Czaplicka (1886–1921). The other expedition members were Maud Doria Haviland (1889–1941) and Henry Usher Hall of the Philadelphia University Museum (1876–1944).

Haviland dedicated her study, Forest Steppe and Tundra, "TO THE MEMORY OF DORA CURTIS AND THE DAYS AND NIGHTS WE SPENT TOGETHER IN FOREST, STEPPE AND TUNDRA".

Early Life, Education and Travels 
Curtis entered University College London in 1892. She gained a second class degree in Fine Art in 1893 and a £2 prize for figure drawing.  She was photographed by Frederick H. Evans in the 1890s.
Dora Curtis

She travelled to China in 1911.

Her sister Ethel Kibblewhite, was an artist and longtime partner to T.E. Hulme. Together, they hosted an important salon together at 67 Frith Street in their family home. The sculptor Jacob Epstein describes seeing Dora there in his memoirs.

She died in a swimming accident in Las Palmas on 4 July 1920.

Artwork 
She illustrated several books including:

Jean Baptiste; a Story of French Canada (frontispiece)

Stories from King Arthur and his Round Table

Tales for Children from Many Lands. London: J. M. Dent and Sons; New York: E. P. Dutton and Co., 1913. 

Jackanapes: And Other Stories by Juliana Horatia Ewing

References

External links 
Dora Curtis' photography available at Photo Album of Maria Czaplicka
Dora Curtis' photography available at Pitt Rivers Museum Database of Photography Collections

British women artists
19th-century births
1920 deaths